GDR, officially the German Democratic Republic (1949–1990), also known as East Germany, was a state during the Cold War.

GDR may also refer to:
 General Distribution Release, a concept in software engineering
 Georgian Democratic Republic (1918–1921), the first modern establishment of a Republic of Georgia
 Giant Dipole Resonance, collective oscillation of all protons against all neutrons in a nucleus
 Global depository receipt, a concept in international banking
 Greenhouse Development Rights, a climate change policy concept
 Gudur Junction railway station, in Andhra Pradesh, India
 Democratic and Republican Left group, a French parliamentary group
 Great Dividing Range, the fifth longest land-based mountain range in the world, situated in eastern Australia
 Graphics display resolution, a comparison of screen resolutions that's measured in pixels.